A thavil (Tamil:தவில்) or tavil is a barrel-shaped percussion instrument from Tamil Nadu. It is also widely used in Andhra Pradesh, Karnataka, Kerala, Tamilnadu and Telangana States of South India. It is used in temple, folk and Carnatic music, often accompanying the nadaswaram. The thavil and the nadaswaram are essential components of traditional festivals and ceremonies in South India.

In folk music contexts, a pair of wider, slimmer sticks are sometimes used. Thanjavur is famous for thavil, so called Thanjavur Thavil. In Kollywood Filmi songs thavils are mostly used, Notable movies: "Thillaanaa Mohanambal", "Paruthiveeran", "Karagattakaran", "Sarvam Thaala Mayam".

History 
Thavil is a traditional musical instrument of the ancient city of Thanjavur in Tamil Nadu. It is an integral part of the Carnatic music in Thanjavur.
It is mostly made in Thanjavur and Valayapatti.

Physical components 

The thavil consists of a cylindrical shell hollowed out of a solid block of jackfruit wood. Layers of animal skin (water buffalo on the right, goat on the left) are stretched across the two sides of the shell using hemp hoops attached to the shell. The right face of the instrument has a larger diameter than the left side, and the right drum head is stretched very tightly, while the left drum head is kept loose to allow pitch bending. The larger face is higher in pitch than the smaller face.

The modern Thavil has a corpus that is bordered by a steel ring coated in plastic on which the two skins are fixed by metal straps. Both skins can be separately tuned.

Methods of use and posture 
The instrument is either played while sitting, or hung by a cloth strap (called nadai) from the shoulder of the player. The right head is played with the right hand, wrist and fingers. The player usually wears thumb caps on all the fingers of the right hand, made of hardened glue from maida flour. The left head is played with a short, thick stick made from the wood of the portia tree.  It is not uncommon for left-handed players to use the opposite hands, and some nadaswaram groups feature both a right- and a left-handed thavil player.

Veteran thavilists

Some master thavil players: 
Thirumulaivayil Muthuveer pillai 
Thirumulaivayil Shanmugavadivel pillai
 Valangaiman A. Shanmugasundaram Pillai
 Kalaimamani Thirucherai.T.G.Muthukumaraswamy Pillai 
 Valayapatti A. R. Subramaniam
 Haridwaramangalam A. K. Palanivel
 Vellore Dr. P.R.M. Venkateshan
 Dakshinamoorthy - Jaffna or Yaazhpaanam , Shri Lanka
 Needamangalam Meenakshi Sundaram Pillai
 Thirunageshwaram Subramanian Pillai
 Bhusurapalli Adisheshaiah
 Iluppur Panchami
 Kumbakonam Thangavel Pillai
 Natchiarkoil Raghava Pillai
 Needamangalam Shanmugavadivel
 Valangaiman Shanmugasundaram Pillai
 Thiruvalaputhur T A Kaliyamurthy
 Tanjore T R Govindaraj
 Shanmugam Thavil - Puducherry
 Thiruppungur T G Muthukumarasamy
 Mannaarkudi Thiru M.R.Vasudevan
 Thirumaignanam Narayanasamy Pillai
 Valiyambakkam V.M Ganapathy

References

External links

Thavil Maestro Haridwaramangalam Sri. A.K. Palanivel

Membranophones
Carnatic music instruments
Tamil music
Percussion instruments played with specialised beaters
Hand drums
Asian percussion instruments